Samuel Alfred Beadle (August 17, 1857 – 1932) was an American poet and attorney, who was born the son of a slave in Atlanta, Georgia, and died in Chicago, Illinois. He published three books of poetry and stories.

After the Civil War, Beadle moved to Jackson, Mississippi, where he studied and practiced law, at one time in partnership with Perry Howard. He married Aurelia Thomas and their son Richard Henry Beadle (1884–1971) became a prominent photographer in Jackson.

Writings
Sketches from Life in Dixie (Chicago: Scroll Publishing and Literary Syndicate, 1899)
Lyrics of "The Underworld" (Jackson, Mississippi: W.A. Scott, 1912)
Adam Shuffler (Jackson, Mississippi: Harmon Publishing Co., 1901)

Bibliography
Randy Patterson, Samuel Alfred Beadle: Black Mississippi Poet of the Early Twentieth Century, POMPA (Publications of the Mississippi Philological Association), 131-136 (1992)

References

1857 births
1932 deaths
Writers from Atlanta
Poets from Georgia (U.S. state)
American lawyers